This illustration labeled regions of the human body show an anterior and posterior view of the body.

Regions
The cranial region includes the upper part of the head while the
facial region includes the lower half of the head beginning below the ears.
The forehead is referred to as the frontal region.
The eyes are referred to as the orbital or ocular region.
The cheeks are referred to as the buccal region.
The ears are referred to as the auricle or otic region.
The nose is referred to as the nasal region.
The mouth is referred to as the oral region.
The chin is referred to as the mental region.
The neck is referred to as the cervical region.
The trunk of the body contains, from superior to inferior,
the thoracic region encompassing the chest
the mammary region encompassing each breast
the sternal region encompassing the sternum
the abdominal region encompassing the stomach area
the umbilical region is located around the navel 
the coxal region (hip region) encompassing the lateral (side) of hips 
the pubic region encompassing the area above the genitals.

The pelvis and legs contain, from superior to inferior,
the inguinal or groin region between the thigh and the abdomen,
the pubic region surrounding the genitals,
the femoral region encompassing the thighs,
the patellar region encompassing the front of the knee,
the crural region encompassing the lower leg, between the knee and ankle,
the fibular region encompassing the outside of the lower leg,
the tarsal region encompassing the ankle,
the pedal region encompassing the foot
the digital/phalangeal region encompassing the toes.
The great toe is referred to as the hallux.
The regions of the upper limbs, from superior to inferior, are
the axillary region encompassing the armpit,
the brachial region encompassing the upper arm,
the antecubital region encompassing the front of the elbow,
the antebrachial region encompassing the forearm,
the carpal region encompassing the wrist,
the palmar region encompassing the palm,
the digital/phalangeal region encompassing the fingers.
The thumb is referred to as the pollex.
The posterior view contains, from superior to inferior,
the cervical region encompassing the neck,
the scapular region encompassing the scapulae and the area around,
the dorsal region encompassing the upper back
the lumbar region encompassing the lower back.
the sacral region occurring at the end of the spine, directly above the buttocks.
The regions of the back of the arms, from superior to inferior, include
the cervical region encompassing the neck,
the acromial region encompassing the shoulder,
the brachial region encompassing the upper arm,
the olecranal region encompassing the back of the elbow,
the antebrachial region encompasses the forearm, front and back
and the manual or manus region encompassing the back of the hand.
The posterior regions of the legs, from superior to inferior, include
the gluteal region encompassing the buttocks,
the femoral region encompassing the thigh,
the popliteal region encompassing the back of the knee,
the sural region encompassing the back of the lower leg,
the calcaneal region encompassing the heel,
the plantar region encompassing the sole of the foot.
Some regions are combined into larger regions. These include the trunk, which is a combination of the thoracic, mammary, abdominal, navel, and coxal regions.
The cephalic region is a combination of all of the head regions.
The upper limb region is a combination of all of the arm regions. The lower limb region is a combination of all of the leg regions.

Deprecated or older regions

Many of these terms are medical latin terms that have fallen into disuse.

Front:
Frons - forehead
Facies - face
Pectus - breast
Latus - flank
Coxa - hip
Genu - knee
Pes - foot
Back:
Vertex - Crown 
Occiput - back of head
Collum - neck
Dorsum - back 
Lumbus - loin
Natis - buttock
Calx - heel

See also
Anatomical terms of location
Human anatomical terms
Human anatomy
Human brain

References

Notes